The HSC Condor 10 is a 74m fast catamaran ferry formerly that has operated in England, New Zealand, Australia and South Korea.

History
Condor 10 was built in 1992 by Incat in Hobart, Australia as Condor Ten but was renamed Condor 10 shortly after. She entered service with Condor Ferries between Weymouth and the Channel Islands in April 1993 replacing the smaller passenger only Condor 9. With Condor 10, Condor Ferries captured a significant share of the Channel Island passenger market which resulted in the closure and sale of British Channel Island Ferries which operated from Poole in 1994. Condor 10 continued to operate for Condor Ferries until October 1994.

In December of that year she arrived in New Zealand on charter to Tranz Rail for the Interislander service. For this service the ship carried the marketing name The Lynx but her official name remained as Condor 10. After completing her first successful summer season in New Zealand, Condor 10 returned to the Northern Hemisphere to operate for Viking Line under the marketing name of Viking Express 1. This began a pattern of the ship operating under charter in both hemispheres for their respective summer seasons which lasted until 1999.

Condor 10 returned to New Zealand again for the 1995/1996 summer season before heading north once again this time on charter to Stena Line for their Fishguard-Rosslare service. After further service in New Zealand, Condor 10 was expected to return to Condor Ferries in 1997 for a new service between Weymouth and Saint-Malo via Guernsey but Holyman required the ship for its new Holyman Sally service between Ramsgate and Dunkirk. This service was not successful and only lasted until October 1997. After yet another season of operating in New Zealand in late 1997 early 1998 the ship returned to Weymouth where she was laid up until being required by Tranz Rail one final time. After 1999 Condor 10'''s place on the Lynx service was taken by Condor Vitesse. After her service on the Interislander, she was briefly chartered by TT-Line for service between Devonport and Melbourne after the Spirit of Tasmania was forced to be laid up for repairs due to fuel contamination after which Condor 10 was laid up at the Incat yard in Hobart in 1999.

After years of lay up Condor 10 was refurbished in 2002 for use once again by Condor Ferries, she was delivered to them in Poole where she was prepared for service. She was placed on the Saint-Malo-Channel Islands run replacing Condor 9 once again. Condor's use of the Condor 10 on the St Malo-Channel Islands route and their aggressive marketing and fare structure for the service was one of the reasons for the decline of Emeraude Lines which eventually closed down.Condor 10 remained on the Saint-Malo-Channel Islands service until September 2010. On wintertime she was laid up in Weymouth, her place taken by one of the larger Condor fastcraft.

In 2010, Condor 10 was replaced by the Condor Rapide. This new ship is similar to the existing ships Condor owns.

In September 2010, Condor 10 was brought back into service to cover the Weymouth/CI routes while Condor Vitesse underwent repairs to two of her four engines.

Once the Condor Vitesse was repaired, Condor 10 was once again retired and remained in Weymouth Port. In September 2011, Condor 10 was sold, and taken by a joint condor and new owner team to Busan in South Korea on a 25-day journey, where she now operates on an internal ferry route under the name Hanil Blue Narae.

Regular Routes
 Weymouth-Guernsey-Jersey-Guernsey-Weymouth April 1993 - October 1994
 Wellington - Picton December 1994 - April 1995
 Helsinki-Tallinn June - September 1995
 Wellington - Picton November 1995 - April 1996
 Fishguard - Rosslare May - October 1996
 Wellington - Picton December 1996 - April 1997
 Ramsgate - Dunkirk May - October 1997
 Wellington - Picton December 1997 - March 1998, December 1998 - July 1999
 Melbourne - Devonport September 1999
 Saint-Malo-Jersey-Guernsey March 2002 - June 2010

Sister ships
 Emeraude France Speedrunner 1
 Snaefell
 Pescara Jet Al Huna I (originally Seacat Scotland)
 Mandarin (originally Stena Sea Lynx 1)

There are also two other 74m hulls built by Incat but show clear differences to the standard 74m design ships above. These are:-
 Patricia Olivia - Modified passenger accommodation and forward windows.
 Atlantic III'' - Has the appearance of an Incat 78m design.

References

External links

Ships built by Incat
Ferries of the United Kingdom
Ferries of France
Transport in Jersey
Transport in Guernsey
Cook Strait ferries
Bass Strait ferries
Incat high-speed craft
1992 ships